WWE: Uncaged is a compilation album of unreleased professional wrestling entrance theme songs which was released by WWE on December 16, 2016. on online music stores. The album features multiple tracks that were not available to the general public before the release of the album, such as the first version of Chris Jericho's theme song "Break the Walls Down", which was composed by Jim Johnston and performed by Adam Morenoff used for his WWE debut back in 1999. The album also features the acoustic versions of Batista's theme song, "I Walk Alone" and Randy Orton's theme song, "Voices" which were used for their WrestleMania 30 video packages, which aired on WWE programming.

Track listing
All songs are composed, written and produced by Jim Johnston.

See also

Music in professional wrestling

References

WWE albums
2017 compilation albums